The Brühl Palace, formerly known as Sandomierski Palace, was a palatial residence standing at Piłsudski Square, in central Warsaw, Poland. It was one of the largest palaces and one of the finest examples of rococo architecture in pre-World War II Warsaw.

History

The palace was built between 1639 and 1642 by Lorenzo de Sent for Crown Grand Chancellor Jerzy Ossoliński in Mannerist style. It was built on the plan of an elongated rectangle with two hexagonal towers at garden side of the building. The palace was adorned with sculptures – an allegory of Poland above the main portal, four figures of kings of Poland in the niches and a statue of Minerva crowning the roof. A possible inspiration for the palace's upper pavilion and its characteristic roof was Bonifaz Wohlmut's reconstruction of Belvedere in Prague, 1557–1563.

After the Chancellor's death the property was inherited by his daughter Helena Tekla Ossolińska, wife of Aleksander Michał Lubomirski, Starost of Sandomierz (from whom it takes its name). Later, between 1681 and 1696, it was rebuilt and remodeled by Tylman Gamerski and Giovanni Bellotti for Prince Józef Karol Lubomirski – Aleksander Michał's son.

In 1750, Heinrich von Brühl bought the palace as a residence. Between 1754 and 1759 it was rebuilt according to designs by Johann Friedrich Knöbel and Joachim Daniel von Jauch. The palace was enhanced and covered with a mansard roof. Two outbuildings were added to the palace complex surrounding a triangular courtyard that sometimes served as a parade ground. From that time the palace was known as the Brühl Palace.

On 27 May 1787, the palace played a key role in a plot by Russian ambassador to Poland, Otto Magnus von Stackelberg. He derailed yet another Polish policy which seemed threatening to Russia. With few major wars in the past decades, the economy of the Commonwealth was improving, and its budget had a notable surplus. Many voices said that the money should be spent on increasing the size, and providing new equipment for, the Polish army. However, as a large Polish army could be a threat to the Russian garrisons controlling Poland, von Stackelberg ordered his proxies in the Permanent Council to spend the money on a different goal: for the huge sum of 1 million zlotys (representing most of the surplus), the council bought the Brühl Palace – and promptly donated it to 'Poland's ally', Russia, to serve as Russia's new embassy.

At the end of the eighteenth century, Dominik Merlini gave the interior a neoclassical look.

During 1932–1937, the palace was adapted for use as the Ministry for Foreign Affairs of the new Polish Republic. The architect this time was Bohdan Pniewski, who added a new modern building and modernized the interiors of all the buildings in the palace complex.

It was deliberately and completely destroyed by the Germans on 18 December 1944 (during World War II, shortly after the Warsaw Uprising).

Around 2008, Warsaw's municipal government authorities have decided to rebuild the Brühl Palace. The new building was to have a facade referring to its historic shape, but a new private investor may adapt the interiors to the needs of either office space or a hotel. As of 2019, the reconstruction has not started.

See also

 Saxon Palace
 Saxon Garden
 Saxon Axis
 Piłsudski Square
 Kotowski Palace

References

 In-line:

 General:

Gallery

External links

 = palac_bruhla&r3 = 0 Warsaw before 1939
 Picture gallery of Saxon Square
 History of the Saxon Palace and the Saxon Axis

Buildings and structures in Poland destroyed during World War II
Demolished buildings and structures in Poland
Former buildings and structures in Poland
Palaces in Warsaw
Houses completed in 1642
Houses completed in 1696
Rococo architecture in Warsaw
1642 establishments in the Polish–Lithuanian Commonwealth
Former palaces in Poland